Wardall is a surname. Notable people with the surname include:

John Wardall
Ronald G. Wardall (1937–2006), American poet
Thomas Wardall (1862–1932), English cricketer